The 13th United States Congress was a meeting of the legislative branch of the United States federal government, consisting of the United States Senate and the United States House of Representatives. It met in Washington, D.C. from March 4, 1813, to March 4, 1815, during the fifth and sixth years of James Madison's presidency. The apportionment of seats in the House of Representatives was based on the 1810 United States census. Both chambers had a Democratic-Republican majority. The first two sessions were held at the Capitol building while the third, convened after the Burning of Washington, took place in the First Patent Building.

Major events

 September 10, 1813: War of 1812: Battle of Lake Erie
 October 5, 1813: War of 1812: Battle of the Thames
 March 27, 1814: Creek War: Battle of Horseshoe Bend
 July 25, 1814: War of 1812: Battle of Lundy's Lane
 August 25, 1814: War of 1812: Burning of Washington
 September 11, 1814: War of 1812: Battle of Lake Champlain
 September 13, 1814: War of 1812: Bombardment of Fort McHenry at Baltimore
 November 7, 1814: War of 1812: Forces under Gen. Andrew Jackson seized Pensacola
 November 23, 1814: Vice President Elbridge Gerry died
 December 15, 1814: Hartford Convention convened through January 5, 1815, in which New England Federalists met to discuss their grievances concerning the ongoing War of 1812 and the political problems arising from the federal government's increasing power. Despite radical outcries among Federalists for New England secession and a separate peace with Great Britain, moderates outnumbered them and extreme proposals were not a major focus of the debate.
 December 24, 1814: War of 1812: Treaty of Ghent signed
 January 8, 1815: War of 1812: Battle of New Orleans

Major legislation

Treaties ratified
 February 17, 1815: War of 1812: Senate ratified the Treaty of Ghent,

Party summary
The count below identifies party affiliations at the beginning of the first session of this congress. Changes resulting from subsequent replacements are shown below in the "Changes in membership" section.

Senate

House of Representatives 
Following the 1810 census, the size of the House was increased to 182 seats from 142.

Leadership

Senate 
 President: Elbridge Gerry (DR), until November 23, 1814; thereafter vacant.
 President pro tempore: William H. Crawford (DR), March 4, 1813 – March 23, 1813
 Joseph B. Varnum (DR), December 6, 1813 – February 3, 1814
 John Gaillard (DR), from November 25, 1814

House of Representatives 
 Speaker: Henry Clay (DR), until January 19, 1814
 Langdon Cheves, (DR), from January 19, 1814

Members
This list is arranged by chamber, then by state. Senators are listed by class, and representatives are listed by district.

Senate
Senators were elected by the state legislatures every two years, with one-third beginning new six-year terms with each Congress. Preceding the names in the list below are Senate class numbers, which indicate the cycle of their election. In this Congress, Class 1 meant their term ended with this Congress, requiring reelection in 1814; Class 2 meant their term began in the last Congress, requiring reelection in 1816; and Class 3 meant their term began in this Congress, requiring reelection in 1818.

Connecticut 
 1. Samuel W. Dana (F)
 3. Chauncey Goodrich (F), until May 13, 1813
 David Daggett (F), from May 13, 1813

Delaware 
 1. Outerbridge Horsey (F)
 2. William H. Wells (F), from May 28, 1813

Georgia 
 2. William H. Crawford (DR), until March 23, 1813
 William B. Bulloch (DR), April 8, 1813 – November 6, 1813
 William W. Bibb (DR), from November 6, 1813
 3. Charles Tait (DR)

Kentucky 
 2. George M. Bibb (DR), until August 23, 1814
 George Walker (DR), August 30, 1814 – December 16, 1814
 William T. Barry (DR), from December 16, 1814
 3. Jesse Bledsoe (DR), until December 24, 1814
 Isham Talbot (DR), from February 2, 1815

Louisiana 
 2. James Brown (DR)
 3. Eligius Fromentin (DR)

Maryland 
 1. Samuel Smith (DR)
 3. Robert H. Goldsborough (F), from May 21, 1813

Massachusetts 
 1. James Lloyd (F), until May 1, 1813
 Christopher Gore (F), from May 5, 1813
 2. Joseph Bradley Varnum (DR)

New Hampshire 
 2. Nicholas Gilman (DR), until May 2, 1814
 Thomas W. Thompson (F), from June 24, 1814
 3. Charles Cutts (F), April 2, 1813 – June 10, 1813
 Jeremiah Mason (F), from June 10, 1813

New Jersey 
 1. John Lambert (DR)
 2. John Condit (DR)

New York 
 1. Obadiah German (DR)
 3. Rufus King (F)

North Carolina 
 2. James Turner (DR)
 3. David Stone (DR), until December 24, 1814
 Francis Locke Jr. (DR), from sometime thereafter (date unknown)

Ohio 
 1. Thomas Worthington (DR), until December 1, 1814
 Joseph Kerr (DR), from December 10, 1814
 3. Jeremiah Morrow (DR)

Pennsylvania 
 1. Michael Leib (DR), until February 14, 1814
 Jonathan Roberts (DR), from February 24, 1814
 3. Abner Lacock (DR)

Rhode Island 
 1. William Hunter (F)
 2. Jeremiah B. Howell (DR)

South Carolina 
 2. John Taylor (DR)
 3. John Gaillard (DR)

Tennessee 
 1. Joseph Anderson (DR)
 2. George W. Campbell (DR), until February 11, 1814
 Jesse Wharton (DR), from March 17, 1814

Vermont 
 1. Jonathan Robinson (DR)
 3. Dudley Chase (DR)

Virginia 
 1. Richard Brent (DR), until December 30, 1814
 James Barbour (DR), from January 2, 1815
 2. William B. Giles (DR), until March 3, 1815

House of Representatives

Connecticut 
All representatives were elected statewide on a general ticket.
 . Epaphroditus Champion (F)
 . John Davenport (F)
 . Lyman Law (F)
 . Jonathan O. Moseley (F)
 . Timothy Pitkin (F)
 . Lewis B. Sturges (F)
 . Benjamin Tallmadge (F)

Delaware 
Both representatives were elected statewide on a general ticket.
 . Thomas Cooper (F)
 . Henry M. Ridgely (F)

Georgia 
All representatives were elected statewide on a general ticket.
 . William Barnett (DR)
 . William W. Bibb (DR), until November 6, 1813
 Alfred Cuthbert (DR), from December 13, 1813
 . John Forsyth (DR)
 . Bolling Hall (DR)
 . Thomas Telfair (DR)
 . George M. Troup (DR)

Kentucky 
 . James Clark (DR)
 . Henry Clay (DR), until January 19, 1814
 Joseph H. Hawkins (DR), from March 29, 1814
 . Richard M. Johnson (DR)
 . Joseph Desha (DR)
 . Samuel Hopkins (DR)
 . Solomon P. Sharp (DR)
 . Samuel McKee (DR)
 . Stephen Ormsby (DR), from April 20, 1813
 . Thomas Montgomery (DR)
 . William P. Duval (DR)

Louisiana 
 . Thomas B. Robertson (DR)

Maryland 
The 5th district was a plural district with two representatives.
 . Philip Stuart (F)
 . Joseph Kent (DR)
 . Alexander C. Hanson (F)
 . Samuel Ringgold (DR)
 . Alexander McKim (DR)
 . Nicholas R. Moore (DR)
 . Stevenson Archer (DR)
 . Robert Wright (DR)
 . Charles Goldsborough (F)

Massachusetts 
 . Artemas Ward Jr. (F)
 . William Reed (F)
 . Timothy Pickering (F)
 . William M. Richardson (DR), until April 18, 1814
 Samuel Dana (DR), from September 22, 1814
 . William Ely (F)
 . Samuel Taggart (F)
 . William Baylies (F)
 . John Reed Jr. (F)
 . Laban Wheaton (F)
 . Elijah Brigham (F)
 . Abijah Bigelow (F)
 . Daniel Dewey (F), until February 24, 1814
 John W. Hulbert (F), from November 2, 1814
 . Nathaniel Ruggles (F)
 . Cyrus King (F)
 . George Bradbury (F)
 . Samuel Davis (F)
 . Abiel Wood (DR)
 . John Wilson (F)
 . James Parker (DR)
 . Levi Hubbard (DR)

New Hampshire 
All representatives were elected statewide on a general ticket.
 . Bradbury Cilley (F)
 . William Hale (F)
 . Samuel Smith (F)
 . Roger Vose (F)
 . Daniel Webster (F)
 . Jeduthun Wilcox (F)

New Jersey 
There were three plural districts, each had two representatives each.
 . Lewis Condict (DR)
 . Thomas Ward (DR)
 . James Schureman (F)
 . Richard Stockton (F)
 . William Coxe Jr. (F)
 . Jacob Hufty (F), until May 20, 1814
 Thomas Bines (DR), from November 2, 1814

New York 
There were six plural districts, the 1st, 2nd, 12th, 15th, 20th & 21st, each had two representatives.
 . John Lefferts (DR)
 . Ebenezer Sage (DR)
 . Egbert Benson (F), until August 2, 1813
 William Irving (DR), from January 22, 1814
 . Jotham Post Jr. (F)
 . Peter Denoyelles (DR)
 . Thomas J. Oakley (F)
 . Thomas P. Grosvenor (F)
 . Jonathan Fisk (DR)
 . Abraham J. Hasbrouck (DR)
 . Samuel Sherwood (F)
 . John Lovett (F)
 . Hosea Moffitt (F)
 . John W. Taylor (DR)
 . Zebulon R. Shipherd (F)
 . Elisha I. Winter (F)
 . Alexander Boyd (F)
 . Jacob Markell (F)
 . John M. Bowers (F), from June 21, 1813, until December 20, 1813
 Isaac Williams Jr. (DR), from January 24, 1814
 . Joel Thompson (F)
 . Morris S. Miller (F)
 . William S. Smith (F)
 . Moss Kent (F)
 . James Geddes (F)
 . Daniel Avery (DR)
 . Oliver C. Comstock (DR)
 . Samuel M. Hopkins (F)
 . Nathaniel W. Howell (F)

North Carolina 
 . William H. Murfree (DR)
 . Willis Alston (DR)
 . William Kennedy (DR)
 . William Gaston (F)
 . William R. King (DR)
 . Nathaniel Macon (DR)
 . John Culpepper (F)
 . Richard Stanford (DR)
 . Bartlett Yancey (DR)
 . Joseph Pearson (F)
 . Peter Forney (DR)
 . Israel Pickens (DR)
 . Meshack Franklin (DR)

Ohio 
 . John McLean (DR)
 . John Alexander (DR)
 . William Creighton Jr. (DR), from May 4, 1813
 . James Caldwell (DR)
 . James Kilbourne (DR)
 . Reasin Beall (DR), from April 20, 1813, until June 7, 1814
 David Clendenin (DR), from October 11, 1814

Pennsylvania 
There were six plural districts, the 2nd, 3rd, 5th, 6th & 10th had two representatives each, the 1st had four representatives.
 . William Anderson (DR)
 . John Conard (DR)
 . Charles J. Ingersoll (DR)
 . Adam Seybert (DR)
 . Roger Davis (DR)
 . Jonathan Roberts (DR), until February 24, 1814
 Samuel Henderson (F), from October 11, 1814
 . John Gloninger (F), until August 2, 1813
 Edward Crouch (DR), from October 12, 1813
 . James Whitehill (DR), until September 1, 1814
 Amos Slaymaker (F), from October 11, 1814
 . Hugh Glasgow (DR)
 . William Crawford (DR)
 . Robert Whitehill (DR), until April 8, 1813
 John Rea (DR), from May 11, 1813
 . Robert Brown (DR)
 . Samuel D. Ingham (DR)
 . John M. Hyneman (DR), until August 2, 1813
 Daniel Udree (DR), from October 12, 1813
 . William Piper (DR)
 . David Bard (DR)
 . Jared Irwin (DR)
 . Isaac Smith (DR)
 . William Findley (DR)
 . Aaron Lyle (DR)
 . Isaac Griffin (DR), from May 24, 1813
 . Adamson Tannehill (DR)
 . Thomas Wilson (DR), from May 14, 1813

Rhode Island 
Both representatives were elected statewide on a general ticket.
 . Richard Jackson Jr. (F)
 . Elisha R. Potter (F)

South Carolina 
 . Langdon Cheves (DR)
 . William Lowndes (DR)
 . Theodore Gourdin (DR)
 . John J. Chappell (DR)
 . David R. Evans (DR)
 . John C. Calhoun (DR)
 . Elias Earle (DR)
 . Samuel Farrow (DR)
 . John Kershaw (DR)

Tennessee 
 . John Rhea (DR)
 . John Sevier (DR)
 . Thomas K. Harris (DR)
 . John H. Bowen (DR)
 . Felix Grundy (DR), until July 1814
 Newton Cannon (DR), from September 16, 1814
 . Parry W. Humphreys (DR)

Vermont 
All representatives were elected statewide on a general ticket.
 . William C. Bradley (DR)
 . Ezra Butler (DR)
 . James Fisk (DR)
 . Charles Rich (DR)
 . Richard Skinner (DR)
 . William Strong (DR)

Virginia 
 . John G. Jackson (DR)
 . Francis White (F)
 . John Smith (DR)
 . William McCoy (DR)
 . James Breckinridge (F)
 . Daniel Sheffey (F)
 . Hugh Caperton (F)
 . Joseph Lewis Jr. (F)
 . John P. Hungerford (DR)
 . Aylett Hawes (DR)
 . John Dawson (DR), until March 31, 1814
 Philip P. Barbour (DR), from September 19, 1814
 . John Roane (DR)
 . Thomas M. Bayly (F)
 . William A. Burwell (DR)
 . John Kerr (DR)
 . John W. Eppes (DR)
 . James Pleasants (DR)
 . Thomas Gholson Jr. (DR)
 . Peterson Goodwyn (DR)
 . James Johnson (DR)
 . Thomas Newton Jr. (DR)
 . Hugh Nelson (DR)
 . John Clopton (DR)

Non-voting delegates 
 . Shadrach Bond, until August 2, 1813
 Benjamin Stephenson, from November 14, 1814
 . Jonathan Jennings
 . William Lattimore
 . Edward Hempstead, until September 17, 1814
 Rufus Easton, from September 17, 1814

Changes in membership
The count below reflects changes from the beginning of the first session of this Congress.

Senate 
 Replacements: 9
 Democratic-Republicans: 2 seat net loss
 Federalists: 2 seat net gain
 Deaths: 2
 Resignations: 10
 Interim appointments: 3
 Vacancies: 3
Total seats with changes: 15

|-
| New Hampshire(3)
| Vacant
| Legislature had failed to elect a Senator.Successor was appointed April 2, 1813 to continue the term.
|  | Charles Cutts (DR)
| Appointed April 2, 1813

|-
| Maryland(3)
| Vacant
| Legislature had failed to elect a Senator.Successor was elected late May 21, 1813 to finish the term.
|  | Robert H. Goldsborough (F)
| Seated May 21, 1813

|-
| Delaware(2)
| Vacant
| James A. Bayard (F) resigned at the end of the previous Congress.Successor elected May 28, 1813 to finish the term.
|  | William H. Wells (F)
| Seated May 28, 1813

|-
| Georgia(2)
|  | William H. Crawford (DR)
| Resigned March 23, 1813.Successor appointed April 8, 1813, to continue the term. 
|  | William Bulloch (DR)
| Seated April 8, 1813

|-
| Connecticut(3)
|  | Chauncey Goodrich (F)
| Resigned May 1813 to become Lieutenant Governor of Connecticut.Successor elected May 13, 1813, to finish the term.
|  | David Daggett (F)
| Seated May 13, 1813

|-
| Massachusetts(1)
|  | James Lloyd (F)
| Resigned May 1, 1813.Successor elected May 5, 1813.
|  | Christopher Gore (F)
| Seated May 5, 1813

|-
| New Hampshire(3)
|  | Charles Cutts (DR)
| Interim appointee was not elected.Successor elected June 10, 1813.
|  | Jeremiah Mason (F)
| Seated June 10, 1813

|-
| Georgia(2)
|  | William Bulloch (DR)
| Interim appointee was not elected to finish the term.Successor elected November 6, 1813 to finish the term.
|  | William W. Bibb (DR)
| Seated November 6, 1813

|-
| Tennessee(2)
|  | George W. Campbell (DR)
| Resigned February 11, 1814 after being appointed US Secretary of the Treasury.Successor appointed March 17, 1814, to continue the term.
|  | Jesse Wharton (DR)
| Seated March 17, 1814

|-
| Pennsylvania(1)
|  | Michael Leib (DR)
| Resigned February 14, 1814 after becoming Postmaster of Philadelphia.Successor elected February 24, 1814, to finish term.
|  | Jonathan Roberts (DR)
| Seated February 24, 1814

|-
| New Hampshire(2)
|  | Nicholas Gilman (DR)
| Died May 2, 1814.Successor elected June 24, 1814, to finish the term.
|  | Thomas W. Thompson (F)
| Seated June 24, 1814

|-
| Kentucky(2)
|  | George M. Bibb (DR)
| Resigned August 23, 1814.Successor appointed August 30, 1814, to continue the term.
|  | George Walker (DR)
| Seated August 30, 1814

|-
| Ohio(1)
|  | Thomas Worthington (DR)
| Resigned December 1, 1814 after being elected Governor.Successor elected December 10, 1814, to finish the term ending.
|  | Joseph Kerr (DR)
| Seated December 10, 1814

|-
| Kentucky(2)
|  | George Walker (DR)
| Interim appointee was not elected to finish term.Successor elected December 16, 1814 to finish term.
|  | William T. Barry (DR)
| Seated December 16, 1814

|-
| North Carolina(3)
|  | David Stone (DR)
| Resigned December 24, 1814.Successor elected December 24, 1814, to finish the term, but failed to qualify.
|  | Francis Locke Jr.
| Never seated for failing to qualify

|-
| Kentucky(3)
|  | Jesse Bledsoe (DR)
| Resigned December 24, 1814.Successor elected February 2, 1815, to finish the term.
|  | Isham Talbot (DR)
| Seated February 2, 1815

|-
| Virginia(1)
|  | Richard Brent (DR)
| Died December 30, 1814.Winner elected January 2, 1815, to finish term, having already won election to the next term.
|  | James Barbour (DR)
| Seated January 2, 1815

|-
| Virginia(2)
|  | William B. Giles (DR)
| Resigned March 3, 1815.Successor was not elected until the next Congress.
| colspan=2 | Vacant for remainder of this Congress.

|}

House of Representatives 
 Replacements: 13
 Democratic-Republicans: 17-seat net gain
 Federalists: 2-seat net loss
 Deaths: 6
 Resignations: 13
 Contested election: 1
 Vacancies: 4
Total seats with changes: 19

|-
| 
| Vacant
| style="font-size:80%" | Rep.-elect John Simpson died before this Congress began
|  | Stephen Ormsby (DR)
| Seated May 28, 1813
|-
| 
| Vacant
| style="font-size:80%" | Rep.-elect John Stark Edwards died before this Congress began
|  | Reasin Beall (DR)
| Seated June 8, 1813
|-
| 
| Vacant
| style="font-size:80%" | Rep.-elect Abner Lacock resigned before commencement of Congress after being elected US Senator
|  | Thomas Wilson (DR)
| Seated May 28, 1813
|-
| 
| Vacant
| style="font-size:80%" | Rep.-elect John Smilie died before this Congress began
|  | Isaac Griffin (DR)
| Seated May 24, 1813
|-
| 
| Vacant
| style="font-size:80%" | Rep-elect William Dowse died on February 18, 1813
|  | John M. Bowers (F)
| Seated June 21, 1813
|-
| 
| Vacant
| style="font-size:80%" | Duncan McArthur Resigned April 5, 1813, having not qualified
|  | William Creighton Jr. (DR)
| Seated June 15, 1813
|-
| 
|  | Robert Whitehill (DR)
| style="font-size:80%" | Died April 8, 1813
|  | John Rea (DR)
| Seated May 28, 1813
|-
| 
|  | Egbert Benson (F)
| style="font-size:80%" | Resigned August 2, 1813
|  | William Irving (DR)
| Seated January 22, 1814
|-
| 
|  | John Gloninger (F)
| style="font-size:80%" | Resigned August 2, 1813
|  | Edward Crouch (DR)
| Seated December 6, 1813
|-
| 
|  | John M. Hyneman (DR)
| style="font-size:80%" | Resigned August 2, 1813
|  | Daniel Udree (DR)
| Seated December 6, 1813
|-
| 
| Shadrach Bond
| style="font-size:80%" | Until August 2, 1813
| Benjamin Stephenson
| Seated November 14, 1814
|-
| 
|  | William W. Bibb (DR)
| style="font-size:80%" | Resigned November 6, 1813, after being elected to US Senate
|  | Alfred Cuthbert (DR)
| Seated February 7, 1814
|-
| 
|  | John M. Bowers (F)
| style="font-size:80%" | Contested election, Bowers ousted on December 20, 1813
|  | Isaac Williams Jr. (DR)
| Seated January 24, 1814
|-
| 
|  | Felix Grundy (DR)
| style="font-size:80%" |Resigned in July 1814
|  | Newton Cannon (DR)
| Seated October 15, 1814
|-
| 
|  | Henry Clay (DR)
| style="font-size:80%" | Resigned January 19, 1814
|  | Joseph H. Hawkins (DR)
| Seated March 29, 1814
|-
| 
|  | Daniel Dewey (F)
| style="font-size:80%" | Resigned February 24, 1814, after being appointed Associate Judge of Massachusetts Supreme Court
|  | John W. Hulbert (F)
| Seated September 26, 1814
|-
| 
|  | Jonathan Roberts (DR)
| style="font-size:80%" | Resigned February 24, 1814, after being elected US Senator
|  | Samuel Henderson (F)
| Seated November 29, 1814
|-
| 
|  | John Dawson (DR)
| style="font-size:80%" | Died March 31, 1814
|  | Philip P. Barbour (DR)
| Seated September 19, 1814
|-
| 
|  | William M. Richardson (DR)
| style="font-size:80%" | Resigned April 18, 1814
|  | Samuel Dana (DR)
| Seated September 22, 1814
|-
| 
|  | Jacob Hufty (F)
| style="font-size:80%" | Died May 20, 1814
|  | Thomas Bines (DR)
| Seated November 2, 1814
|-
| 
|  | Reasin Beall (DR)
| style="font-size:80%" | Resigned June 7, 1814
|  | David Clendenin (DR)
| Seated December 22, 1814
|-
| 
|  | James Whitehill (DR)
| style="font-size:80%" | Resigned September 1, 1814
|  | Amos Slaymaker (F)
| Seated December 12, 1814
|-
| 
| Edward Hempstead
| style="font-size:80%" | Until September 17, 1814
| Rufus Easton
| Seated November 16, 1814
|}

Committees
Lists of committees and their party leaders.

Senate

 Army Supply Contracts (Select) (Chairman: N/A)
 Audit and Control the Contingent Expenses of the Senate (Chairman: Michael Leib)
 Engrossed Bills (Chairman: Jeremiah B. Howell)
 National University (Chairman: N/A)
 Whole

House of Representatives

 Accounts (Chairman: Israel Pickens then Nicholas R. Moore then John Kershaw)
 Banks of the District of Columbia (Select) 
 Claims (Chairman: Stevenson Archer then Bartlett Yancey)
 Commerce and Manufactures (Chairman: Thomas Newton Jr.)
 District of Columbia (Chairman: John Dawson)
 Elections (Chairman: James Fisk)
 Judiciary (Chairman: Charles J. Ingersoll)
 Pensions and Revolutionary War Claims (Chairman: Samuel D. Ingham then John J. Chappell) 
 Post Office and Post Roads (Chairman: John Rhea)
 Public Expenditures (Chairman: James Pleasants then Nathaniel Macon)
 Public Lands (Chairman: Samuel McKee)
 Revisal and Unfinished Business (Chairman: Willis Alston then Lewis Condict then Richard Stanford)
 Rules (Select) 
 Standards of Official Conduct 
 Ways and Means (Chairman: John W. Eppes)
 Whole

Joint committees

 Enrolled Bills (Chairman: N/A)
 The Library (Chairman: N/A)

Employees 
 Librarian of Congress: Patrick Magruder

Senate 
 Chaplain: John Brackenridge (Presbyterian), until September 27, 1814
 Jesse Lee, Methodist, elected September 27, 1814
 Secretary: Samuel A. Otis, until April 22, 1814
 Charles Cutts, elected October 12, 1814
 Sergeant at Arms: Mountjoy Bayly

House of Representatives 
 Chaplain: Jesse Lee (Methodist), until September 27, 1814
 Obadiah B. Brown (Baptist), elected September 27, 1814
 Clerk: Patrick Magruder, until January 30, 1815
 Thomas Dougherty, elected January 30, 1815
 Doorkeeper: Thomas Claxton
 Reading Clerks: 
 Sergeant at Arms: Thomas Dunn

See also 
 1812 United States elections (elections leading to this Congress)
 1812 United States presidential election
 1812–13 United States Senate elections
 1812–13 United States House of Representatives elections
 1814 United States elections (elections during this Congress, leading to the next Congress)
 1814–15 United States Senate elections
 1814–15 United States House of Representatives elections

Notes

References

External links
 Statutes at Large, 1789–1875
 Senate Journal, First Forty-three Sessions of Congress
 House Journal, First Forty-three Sessions of Congress
 Biographical Directory of the U.S. Congress
 U.S. House of Representatives: House History
 U.S. Senate: Statistics and Lists